Raimana John Li Fung Kuee (born 10 April 1985) is a Tahitian footballer currently playing for A.S. Pirae, where he plays as a striker.

He received a silver medal with the Tahiti national team after losing the final against the Portugal national team during the 2015 FIFA Beach Soccer World Cup in Espinho, Portugal.
He received the bronze ball award during the 2013 FIFA Beach Soccer World Cup in Tahiti, French Polynesia. In 2014-2015 he became league Top Scorer with 30 goals while playing for A.S. Pirae.

In October 2013 he was appointed a knight of the Order of Tahiti Nui.

International career

International goals
Scores and results list Tahiti's goal tally first.

References

FIFA.com

External links
 

1985 births
Living people
Tahiti international footballers
French Polynesian footballers
Tahitian beach soccer players
A.S. Pirae players
French Polynesian people of Chinese descent
Sportspeople of Chinese descent
Association football forwards
Recipients of the Order of Tahiti Nui